John Arthur Copleston Kiddle  (16 April 1885 — 4 June 1954) was an English first-class cricketer and British Army officer.

The son of J. C. Copleston, he was born at British India in Bombay in April 1885. He was educated in England at Dulwich College, where he played for the cricket eleven and the rugby fifteen. After leaving Dulwich in 1904, Kiddle returned to India, where in 1905 he played a first-class cricket match for the Europeans cricket team against the Parsees at Poona in the Bombay Presidency Match. He took the wickets of Jemi Modi, D. M. Raja, J. J. Dubash, and K. B. Mistry in the Parsees first innings for the cost of 97 runs. Kiddle served in the British Indian Army in the First World War, being commissioned into the Reserve of Officers as a second lieutenant in July 1915. He was attached to the 125th Napier's Rifles, where in May 1916 he was appointed a temporary captain while in command of a company. In June 1916, he was awarded the Military Cross for gallantry. Kiddle was promoted to lieutenant the in July 1917, antedated to July 1916; he relinquished this temporary appointment in May 1918. By July 1918, he was serving as a lieutenant in the 124th Baluchistan Infantry, being appointed a temporary captain while an adjutant. He resigned from the British Indian Army in May 1922, retaining the rank of captain.

Kiddle married Helen Bertha Fletcher in May 1925. He later retired to England, where he died at Stoke Mandeville in June 1954.

References

External links

1885 births
1954 deaths
People from Mumbai
People educated at Dulwich College
English cricketers
Europeans cricketers
Indian Army personnel of World War I
British Indian Army officers
Recipients of the Military Cross
Military personnel of British India